Chereshovo is a village in the municipality of Smolyan, located in the Smolyan Province of southern Bulgaria. The village is located 170 km from Sofia. As of 2007, the village had a population of 13 people.

Geography
The village is located in a mountainous region.

History
The Ottoman register of 1841 says that a soldier enlisted in the army from Chereshovo (at that time called Kirazli), which gives evidence of Muslims living there. In 1903, there were 15 houses. According to Lyubomir Miletich, in 1912, the entire population of Chereshovo consisted of Bulgarian Muslims. The number of Muslims during 1912-13 were 110.

References

Villages in Smolyan Province